KPPV (106.7 FM, "The Mix 106.7 FM") is an American radio station licensed to serve Prescott Valley, Arizona, United States. It began broadcasting on September 1, 1985 from the studio at Robert Road and Jacque Drive.  The station is owned by Sanford and Terry Cohen d/b/a Arizona's Hometown Radio Group and licensed to Prescott Valley Broadcasting Co. Inc. Its coverage area spans the Prescott/Prescott Valley/Chino Valley/Dewey-Humboldt Quad Cities area.  KPPV is also heard via licensed FM booster on 106.7 in Cottonwood and Clarkdale, Arizona and via FM Translator on 100.7 in Flagstaff, AZ.  KPPV developed the first solar powered FM transmitter site atop Glassford Hill in 1986. KPPV received commendations from the Small Business Administration as Innovative Advocates of the year for 1987 and special recognition by the US Secretary of Energy. In 1992, it was granted permission to upgrade to Class C2 at 50,000 watts ERP and moved to Mt. Francis SW of Prescott.  KPPV won the National Association of Broadcasters Crystal Award for outstanding community service in 1988. It airs an adult contemporary music format.

KPPV-HD 2 broadcasts JACK FM and by translator on 94.7 serving the Prescott Quad Cities and Cottonwood.

KPPV-HD 3 broadcasts JUAN FM  (Spanish Format) and by translator on 107.1 serving the Prescott Quad Cities and Cottonwood.

KPPV is a member of the Prescott, Prescott Valley, Chino Valley, Cottonwood-Verde Valley and Flagstaff Chambers of Commerce as well as a member of the Prescott Downtown Partnership.

The station was assigned the "KPPV" call sign by the Federal Communications Commission on October 7, 1994.

Translators

References

External links
 KPPV official website

 
 
 
 
 
 
 
 
 
 

PPV
Mainstream adult contemporary radio stations in the United States
Radio stations established in 1985
Mass media in Yavapai County, Arizona
1985 establishments in Arizona